Syed Arez Ahmed is a Pakistani actor and model. He is known for his roles in Mehar Posh, Kahin Deep Jaley, Mera Rab Waris, Mohabbat Daagh Ki Soorat and Uraan.

Early life
Syed Arez was born in 1991 on 7 November in Karachi, Pakistan. He completed his studies from University of Karachi graduated with Bachelors in Maritime Studies. Later he studied at Institute of Business Management.

Career
He also did theatre at University. In 2016 he made his debut in drama Maikay Ki Yaad Na Aaye as Subhan and later in 2017 he appeared in drama Bholi Bano as Soban. He was noted for his roles in dramas Hina Ki Khushboo, Sodai, Tum Se Hi Talluq Hai and Piya Naam Ka Diya. He also appeared in dramas Shahrukh Ki Saliyan, Mera Rab Waris, Kahin Deep Jaley and Tarap. Since then he appeared in dramas Uraan, Dil Tanha Tanha and Mehar Posh. In 2019 he appeared in Senti Aur Mental and in a movie Betabiyan as Zain.

Personal life
He also served in Merchant Navy and he joined NAPA to pursue theatre.

On December 7, 2021, he revealed that he will marry with his Bholi Bano, Tarap and Inteha-e-Ishq co-star Hiba Bukhari. Both later got married in a private Nikah ceremony held on 7 January 2022.

Filmography

Television

Telefilm

Film

References

External links
 
 
 

1991 births
Living people
21st-century Pakistani male actors
Pakistani male film actors
Pakistani male television actors